Grangenolvin G.F.C. is a Gaelic football (GFC) club based in southern County Kildare, Ireland. The club competes in the County Kildare GAA board league and cup system. Grangenolvin are a former AIB club of the year winner in 1985. Mick Carolan was chosen on the Kildare football team of the millennium and was a Cuchulainn All Stars Award winner in 1966.

History
The 1890 RIC files show Kilkea Geraldines had 40 members with P. J. Kennedy, William Farrell, John B. Ryan and Martin Lawlor recorded as officers. Grangenolvin GFC was founded in 1955 and purchased its grounds at Ardree in 1971. Murphy Memorial park was officially opened in 1985.

Gaelic football
The arrival of Johnny Morrissey and Johnny Miller in 1963 transformed the club. They won Junior B championship in 1964, the Junior A championship and Jack Higgins Cup in 1965. Kevin Wynne and Martin Mannion played inter-county from that team. Niall Connolly and Paul Doyle were on the Grange teams that won Junior B in 1985, Junior A in 1987 and were beaten Intermediate finalists in 1991.

Honours
 Jack Higgins Cup Winners (3) 1965, 1987, 2005
 Kildare Junior A Football Championship (3) 1965, 1987, 2005
 Kildare Junior B Football Championship (2) 1964, 1985
 Kildare Minor Football League (2) 1981, 1984

Bibliography
 Kildare GAA: A Centenary History, by Eoghan Corry, CLG Chill Dara, 1984,  hb  pb
 Kildare GAA yearbook, 1972, 1974, 1978, 1979, 1980 and 2000- in sequence especially the Millennium yearbook of 2000
 Soaring Sliothars: Centenary of Kildare Camogie 1904-2004 by Joan O'Flynn Kildare County Camogie Board.

External links
Facebook page
Kildare GAA site
Kildare GAA club sites
Kildare on Hoganstand.com

Gaelic games clubs in County Kildare
Gaelic football clubs in County Kildare